Arbetarhistoria is a quarterly magazine on labour history published by the Swedish Labour Movement Archives and Library. It was established in 1977 as Meddelande från Arbetarrörelsens arkiv och bibliotek and obtained its current name in 1984. It is targeted both at academics and the interested public. It is based in Huddinge.

Each issue usually contains articles about the labour movement and working life history centred on a theme, such as "working conditions", "political protest", "Olof Palme and his time", "the Spanish Civil War", "women in the communism movement" or "Swedish working class literature in an international perspective" as well as reports on ongoing research, reviews on new works in the discipline, and introductions to source material from the collections at the Labour Movement Archives and Library.

References

External links
 

1977 establishments in Sweden
History magazines
Magazines established in 1977
Magazines published in Stockholm
Multilingual magazines
Political magazines published in Sweden
Quarterly magazines published in Sweden
Socialist magazines
Swedish-language magazines
Works about the labor movement
Working-class literature